Chernow is a surname. Notable persons with this name include:
Ann Chernow (born 1936), American artist
Barbara Chernow, American academic administrator
Ron Chernow (born 1949), American writer, journalist, historian, and biographer 
Admiral Chernow of Designated Survivor (TV series)
Michael Chernow, American, executive chef of The Meatball Shop

See also 
 Chernov
 Chernoff